Nanle County is a county in the north of Henan province, China, bordering the provinces of Hebei and Shandong to the north and east, respectively. It is the northernmost county-level division of Puyang City.

Administrative divisions
As 2012, this county is divided to 4 towns and 8 townships.
Towns

Townships

Climate

References

County-level divisions of Henan
Puyang